Kang Kon (June 23, 1918 – September 8, 1950) was a Korean military leader active in Manchuria and the Korean peninsula as well as a politician during the years leading up to the Korean War and during the first stages of the Korean War in 1950.

Biography
Kang (born Kang Shin-tae)  was born in Sangju, Gyeongsangbuk-do (modern South Korea), on June 23, 1918, and at the young age of 16 began his involvement in national liberation and military ventures. He moved to Jilin Province in Manchuria as a child and grew up there. As a teenager, he was actively involved in recruiting anti-Japanese guerrillas for his long-time friend, Kim Il Sung, and is remembered as being unusually tall and often towering over others. Before his leadership roles in the Korean War, Kang joined the anti-Japanese struggle in Manchuria in 1932, and later fled into Soviet territory in the early 1940s, where, by the end of World War II was an officer in the 88th Independent Brigade in the Red Army, consisting of both Korean and Chinese soldiers. Lieutenant General Kang led the North Korean Army offensive during the opening stages of the Korean War until he was killed by a land mine on September 8, 1950.

Pre-Korean War
Like many of the others who served in high ranking positions under Kim Il Sung, Kang had served with Kim in Manchuria fighting against the Japanese. While in Manchuria he organized and commanded the Kiring peace Preservation Army. Even though Kang (and other Koreans fighting in Manchuria) had better military credentials than Kim, Kim was encouraged to take the reins of the new communist country because of ability to cultivate the Russians.

In the summer of 1946, Kang returned from Soviet Russia to North Korea to help establish the Korean People's Army and by 1948 he was appointed the Chief of the General Staff Department, and was an important figure in the planning of the South Korean invasion with the help of Russian war strategists and was selected to lead the invasion. He was a member of the Central Committee of the Workers' Party of Korea and a member of the Supreme People's Assembly.

Kang was known as a ruthless soldier, as was reflected in the armies he commanded; they were aggressive, insensitive to risk, and eager for a victory by August 15, as Kim Il Sung demanded.

Korean War
General Kang Kon spearheaded the North Korean People's Army operations southeast towards Pusan. His military endeavors were successful and had pushed the South Korean and UN forces down to the Pusan Perimeter, and on the morning of August 4, 1950, the North Korean's were ready to strike their final blow, and capture the last UN controlled area on the Peninsula. On August 4, the morning that began the Battle of Pusan Perimeter, General Kang was injured when his makeshift command post (an abandoned meat-packaging plant, selected for its thick concrete walls, originally constructed for refrigeration) was struck by a 500-pound bomb. The blast killed three people and wounded eight, one of whom was Kang. He had been in the radio room checking messages at the time of the explosion and suffered a head injury and a broken forearm.

Death 
On September 8, 1950, General Kang and several others were killed by a land mine in Andong, Gyeongbuk, not far from his hometown. He was awarded “Hero of the Republic”   and two days after his death, Kim Il Sung held a funeral for his fallen, long-time comrade in Pyongyang.

Legacy 
In 1968 Kim Il Sung built a statue for Kang, and there is a North Korean military school named after him, Kang Kon Military Academy.

References

External links
 

|-

1918 births
1950 deaths
North Korean military personnel of the Korean War
Military personnel killed in the Korean War
North Korean generals
Korean expatriates in the Soviet Union
Landmine victims
Members of the 2nd Central Committee of the Workers' Party of Korea
Members of the 1st Supreme People's Assembly
People of 88th Separate Rifle Brigade